Bayırlı (literally "place with hill(s)") is a Turkish place name and may refer to the following places in Turkey:

 Bayırlı, Hasankeyf, a village in Hasankeyf district, Batman Province
 Bayırlı, Lice
 Bayırlı, Samsat, a village in Samsat district, Adıyaman Province
 Bayırlı, Sındırgı, a village
 Bayırlı, Suluova, a village in Suluova district, Amasya Province

See also 
 Bayır (disambiguation), literally "hill"
 Bayırköy (disambiguation), literally "hill village"